Armand Joseph "Big Ben" Cardoni  (August 21, 1920 – April 2, 1969) was a Major League Baseball pitcher. He played three seasons with the Boston Braves from 1943 to 1945.

References

External links

Boston Braves players
Major League Baseball pitchers
1920 births
1969 deaths
Baseball players from Pennsylvania
Bradford Bees players
Hartford Bees players
Milwaukee Brewers (minor league) players
Indianapolis Indians players
Montreal Royals players
Mobile Bears players
Scranton Miners players
Scranton Red Sox players
Albany Senators players
Wilkes-Barre Barons (baseball) players